Franz Ambrosius Reuss (3 October 1761, Prague – 9 September 1830, Bilin) was a Czech geologist, mineralogist and balneologist. He was the father of geologist August Emanuel von Reuss.

He studied medicine in Prague and obtained his medical doctorate in 1782. As a student, he developed a strong interest in geology and mineralogy and subsequently visited the Bergakademie in Freiberg, where he attended lectures given by Abraham Gottlob Werner, a proponent of geological Neptunism. Later on, he was hired by Prince Lobkowitz to serve as a spa physician in Bilin, a town in northwestern Bohemia. Here, he conducted investigations of the regions' mineral deposits, that included orographic and paragenetic studies of its highlands. He was the author of a number of works on the composition, geology and utilization of mineral resources at Bilin, Franzensbad, Liebwerda, Teplitz, etc. For this, and for his comments made regarding the mining aspects of regional mineral deposits, he was named royal Bergrat (councilor of mines) in 1808.

He also conducted extensive mineralogical studies of the regions' mineral springs from a medicinal standpoint. From 1780 he assembled a systematic collection of minerals that was continued by his son, August Emanuel.

Published works 
He was the author of a four-volume textbook on mineralogy, Lehrbuch der Mineralogie (1801-06), in which he gives a total account of Werner's ideas. A few of Reuss's other written efforts are:
 Orographie des nordwestlichen Mittelgebirges in Böhmen, 1790 – Orography of the northwestern highlands of Bohemia.
 Mineralogische Geographie von Böhmen, (2 volumes) 1793-97 – Mineralogical geography of Bohemia.
 Sammlung naturhistorischer Aufsätze : mit vorzüglichen Hinsicht auf die Mineralgeschichte Böhmens, 1796.
 Die Mineralquellen zu Bilin, 1808 – The mineral springs of Bilin.
 Die Mineralquellen zu Liebwerda in Böhmen, 1811 – The mineral springs of Liebwerda.

References 

1761 births
1830 deaths
Scientists from Prague
Czech mineralogists
Czech geologists